Michael Kahn (born December 8, 1930) is an American film editor known for his frequent collaboration with Steven Spielberg. His first collaboration with Spielberg was for his 1977 film, Close Encounters of the Third Kind. He has edited all of Spielberg's subsequent films except for E.T. the Extra-Terrestrial (1982), which was edited by Carol Littleton. Kahn has received eight Academy Award nominations for Best Film Editing, and has won three times—for Raiders of the Lost Ark (1981), Schindler's List (1993), and Saving Private Ryan (1998), which were all Spielberg-directed films.

Life and career
Kahn was born on December 8 in New York City; while his birth year has been reported as 1935, Kahn said in 2015, when asked if he was 80, that his age at that point was "closer to 85." Kahn has edited digitally since at least Twister (1996), though he continued to edit on film with Spielberg long after most editors had stopped doing so. In 2008, Kahn acknowledged that "people find it hard to believe that Steven and I still edit film on a Moviola and a KEM. [But] Steven feels film got us where we are today and he loves the smell of it and feel of it. We started that way and both really enjoy it." George Lucas remarked "Michael Kahn can cut faster on a Moviola than anybody can cut on an Avid." However, since The Adventures of Tintin: The Secret of the Unicorn (2011), Kahn has edited Spielberg's films on an Avid machine.

Awards
With eight Academy Award nominations, Kahn tied with Thelma Schoonmaker for being the most-nominated editor in Academy Awards history. In addition, Kahn holds the record for the most wins (three) in the category of the Academy Awards for Best Film Editing, tied with Schoonmaker, Daniel Mandell, and Ralph Dawson. All of the films for which he won Oscars were directed by Steven Spielberg: Raiders of the Lost Ark (1981), Schindler's List (1993), and Saving Private Ryan (1998).

He has received six BAFTA nominations for Best Editing, winning two for Schindler's List and Fatal Attraction.

Kahn has been selected for membership in the American Cinema Editors (ACE). In 2011, he received the Career Achievement Award of the American Cinema Editors. At the ceremony, Steven Spielberg said of editing: "this is where filmmaking goes from a craft to an art." In November 2013, Spielberg created the Michael Kahn Endowed Chair in Editing at the University of Southern California's School of Cinematic Arts in honor of Kahn. The first to be appointed to the position was Norman Hollyn.

Filmography

References

External links
 
 Cinema Editor Magazine Interview with Kahn
 Kahn on cutting War Horse - BTL
 Flickering Myth Article about Kahn
 Post Magazine Article on Kahn
 Movies Made Easy Interview with Kahn

1930 births
Living people
American Cinema Editors
American film editors
Artists from New York City
Best Editing BAFTA Award winners
Best Film Editing Academy Award winners